The Roman Catholic Diocese of Goré is a diocese in Goré in the Ecclesiastical province of N'Djamena in Chad.

History
 November 28, 1998: Established as Diocese of Goré from the Diocese of Doba and Diocese of Moundou

Leadership
 Bishops of Goré (Roman rite)
 Bishop Rosario Pio Ramolo, O.F.M. Cap. (since November 28, 1998)

See also
Roman Catholicism in Chad

Sources
 GCatholic.org

Gore
Christian organizations established in 1998
Roman Catholic dioceses and prelatures established in the 20th century
Roman Catholic Ecclesiastical Province of N'Djaména